Jeffrey Michael Manship (born January 16, 1985) is an American former professional baseball pitcher. He has played in Major League Baseball (MLB) for the Minnesota Twins, Colorado Rockies, Philadelphia Phillies, and Cleveland Indians. Manship has also played for the NC Dinos of the KBO League.

Career

Amateur
At Ronald Reagan High School in San Antonio, he was an All-American with a 22–2 record and 0.65 earned run average his final two seasons ( and ) with four no-hitters (one perfect game), and a 7.9 strikeout-to-walk ratio. He was drafted by the Arizona Diamondbacks out of high school, but chose instead to attend Notre Dame. He missed his entire freshman season at Notre Dame following reconstructive elbow surgery on February 11, . In 2005, he played collegiate summer baseball with the Cotuit Kettleers of the Cape Cod Baseball League. He was selected by the Twins in the 14th round of the 2006 MLB Draft.

Minnesota Twins

2006–2008
In Manship's first season of professional ball, his combined effort for the Gulf Coast League Twins and Fort Myers Miracle was 22 strikeouts in 15 innings pitched with only two earned runs for a 1.20 ERA. He began the  season with the Beloit Snappers of the Midwest League, going 7–1 with a 1.51 ERA to earn a Midwest League All-Star nod, and a promotion back up to Minnesota's advanced A affiliate in Fort Myers.

Manship was again a member of the Miracle's roster for the start of the  season. After going 7–3 with a 2.86 ERA and 63 strikeouts to help the Miracle capture the Florida State League's first-half West Division title, he was again named to his league's All-Star team. Following the game, Manship was promoted the Twins' double A Eastern League affiliate, the New Britain Rock Cats. With the Rock Cats, Manship's record fell to 3–6 with a 4.46 ERA.

2009
Manship began the  season at New Britain, going 6–4, with a 4.28 ERA and 45 strikeouts in 13 starts, before being promoted to the triple A Rochester Red Wings on June 24. At Rochester, he went 4–2 with a 3.22 ERA and 30 strikeouts in eight starts. On August 12, 2009, Manship had his contract purchased by the Twins when left-handed pitcher Glen Perkins was placed on the disabled list with a shoulder strain. Manship was used in relief despite not having done so since college.  He finished the season appearing in 11 games, 5 of them starts. He did not make the Twins 2009 playoff roster.

2010
Manship began the  season with the Rochester Red Wings, posing a 2–2 record with a 3.48 ERA and 13 strikeouts in four April starts. He was called up to pitch for the Twins on May 1, starting in place of the unavailable Nick Blackburn, who was not with the team for family reasons. Manship did not figure in the decision, giving up two earned runs and striking out six in a 5–4 loss to the Cleveland Indians. Manship was optioned back to Rochester on May 4, to make room for the return of Blackburn. Manship played the majority of the season in AAA, appearing in only 13 games for the Twins.

2011
After starting the  season with the Twins, Manship was optioned to Triple-A Rochester on April 17 and was never called back up to the majors.

2012

Manship began the 2012 season with Rochester, going 4–1 with a 3.08 ERA in 12 games before being recalled to help with the bullpen on May 27, then finished the season strong back with Rochester after a rough time with the major league team. On October 24, 2012, the Twins announced that Manship had been removed from the team's 40 man roster.

Colorado Rockies
On November 23, 2012, just a month after being cut by Minnesota, Manship was signed by the Colorado Rockies. He made his 2013 major league debut on August 8 against the New York Mets. He threw five innings in a losing effort. He was outrighted off the roster on October 16, 2013.

Philadelphia Phillies
On December 5, 2013, Manship signed a minor-league contract with the Philadelphia Phillies that includes an invitation to spring training. He made the club's 2014 Opening Day roster after a strong exhibition season. Manship was designated for assignment on July 23, 2014. He elected free agency in October 2014.

Cleveland Indians
On December 24, 2014, Manship signed a minor-league contract with the Cleveland Indians.  He was promoted to the Indians' major league club on June 18, 2015. In his two seasons with the Indians, Manship enjoyed the best two seasons of his career, pitching in 85 games total for the Indians and registering an ERA of 2.07 while also appearing in 3 games for the Indians in the 2016 playoffs.

The Indians declined to tender Manship a contract for the 2017 season by the December 2, 2016 deadline, making him a free agent.

NC Dinos
On January 21, 2017, Manship signed with the NC Dinos of the KBO League.

Cincinnati Reds
On February 6, 2018, Manship signed a minor league deal with the Cincinnati Reds. The contract was voided on February 15, after Manship failed his physical.

References

External links

1985 births
Living people
Baseball players from San Antonio
Major League Baseball pitchers
Minnesota Twins players
Colorado Rockies players
Philadelphia Phillies players
Cleveland Indians players
Notre Dame Fighting Irish baseball players
Cotuit Kettleers players
Gulf Coast Twins players
Beloit Snappers players
Fort Myers Miracle players
Phoenix Desert Dogs players
New Britain Rock Cats players
Rochester Red Wings players
Colorado Springs Sky Sox players
Florida Complex League Phillies players
Lehigh Valley IronPigs players
Columbus Clippers players
KBO League pitchers
American expatriate baseball players in South Korea
NC Dinos players